Gymnomacquartia is a genus of parasitic flies in the family Tachinidae. There is one described species in Gymnomacquartia, Gymnomacquartia japonica.

References

Further reading

 
 
 
 

Tachinidae
Articles created by Qbugbot
Tachinidae genera
Monotypic Diptera genera